Orocobix was the principal regional Taíno Cacique (chief) of the central mountain region of Puerto Rico called Jatibonicu in the 16th century. The Jatibonicu territorial region covered the present day municipalities of Aibonito, Orocovis, Barranquitas, Morovis and Corozal. The Taíno language name Orocobix or O-roco-bis literally means: 'Remembrance of the First Great Mountain.'

The seat of power of Orocobix's kingdom and caney (longhouse) was located in the town of Aibonito. Orocobix was the first cousin of Cacique Agüeybaná (The Great Sun). His wife was named "La Cacica" Yayo, she was the mother of Cacica Catalina. Cacique Orocobix and Cacica Yayo were both later enslaved in the year 1514 and worked in the Royal Mines of the King of Spain, in Utuado. Orocobix also had a younger brother, named Cacique Oromico, who was the chief of the tribal region of Horomico, that today bears the same name of the town of Hormigueros.

Surveyors in 1952 claimed that Palo Hincado, a barrio in Barranquitas may have been the home of Orocobix.

See also

List of Puerto Ricans
Agüeybaná
Agüeybaná II
List of Taínos
Arasibo
Hayuya
Jumacao 
Tibes Indigenous Ceremonial Center

References

 Aurelio Tanodi (1971) Documentos De La Real Hacienda De Puerto Rico, Volumen #1 (1510–1519)

Indigenous Caribbean people
16th-century indigenous people of the Americas
Taíno leaders
16th-century rulers in North America
Puerto Rican people of Taíno descent